This is a list of Spanish television related events in 1979.

Events 
 31 March: Betty Missiego performing the song Su canción represents Spain at the Eurovision Song Contest 1979, that took place in Jerusalem, ranking 2nd.

Debuts

Television shows

La 1

Ending this year

La 1 
 Novela (1962-1979)
 Un Globo, dos globos, tres globos (1974-1979) 
 Hora 15 (1977-1979) 
 El Recreo (1977-1979) 
 Los Espectáculos (1978-1979) 
 El Hotel de las mil y una estrellas (1978-1979)
 El Juglar y la reina (1978-1979) 
 La Segunda oportunidad (1978-1979) 
 Sumarísimo (1978-1979) 
 Tiempo libre (1978-1979)

La 2 
 Torneo (1967-1979)
 Redacción noche (1976-1979)

Foreign series debuts in Spain

Births 
 1 January - Gisela, singer.
 2 January - Alfonso Merlos, host.
 30 January - Carlos Latre, comedian.
 17 March - Pilar Rubio, hostess.
 20 March - Silvia Abascal, actress.
 27 March - Susana Guasch, hostess.
 5 April - Cristina Urgel, actress.
 7 April - Ruth Núñez, actress.
 18 April - Nuria Fergó, singer and actress.
 20 April - Quique Peinado, comedian.
 18 May - Iago García - actor.
 29 May -  Elena Sánchez, hostess.
 5 June - David Bisbal, Singer.
 28 June - Roberto Leal, host.
 29 June - Alejo Sauras, actor.
 30 June - Raquel Martínez, journalist and hostess.
 3 July - Berta Collado, hostess.
 23 July - Dani Mateo, host and actor.
 29 July - Sandra Sabatés, hostess.
 10 September - Darío Sánchez Paso, actor.
 5 October - Patricia Conde, hostess.
 24 October - Silvia Intxaurrondo, hostess
 8 November - Ana Morgade, hostess
 8 December - Manu Guix, composer
 11 July - Marina Gatell - actress.

Deaths 
 5 June - Gustavo Re, host, 70.
 12 September - Laly Soldevila, actress, 46.

See also
 1979 in Spain
 List of Spanish films of 1979

References 

1979 in Spanish television